Caribattus is a monotypic genus of  jumping spiders containing the single species, Caribattus inutilis. It was first described by E. B. Bryant in 1950, and is only found on the Greater Antilles. The name is derived from "Caribbean", and -attus, a common suffix for salticid genera. The species name inutilis is Latin for "useless".

References

Endemic fauna of Jamaica
Monotypic Salticidae genera
Salticidae
Spiders of the Caribbean
Arthropods of the Dominican Republic